Nyaya Ellide is an Indian Kannada-language film which was released on 3 September 1982. It is a remake of the Tamil movie Sattam Oru Iruttarai, which was directed by S. A. Chandrasekhar, who also directed the Kannada version of the film. It was produced by Dwarakish and Prabhakara Reddy under the banner of D R Films.

According to The Hindu it was one of the 1980s films with revolutionary songs.

Plot 
Inspector Durga lives with her widowed mother and little brother Vijay, who fights for justice whenever he comes across injustice in society and gets caught by the police. Vijay is frequently at loggerheads with Durga due to his aggressive behaviour. 

Vijay's only mission in life is to kill three men: George, Javed and Jagannath. Vijay's father Gopal Rao happened to witness a murder committed by the trio. Despite being arrested and imprisoned, the trio managed to come out of prison, where they killed Gopal Rao and his family except Vijay, Durga and their mother. When Vijay and Durga approached the police to report the killings, the police brushed them off by stating that the accused were in prison when the murders took place and hence the murder could not have committed by them. The trio's method of committing the murders with an alibi registers in Vijay's mind and decides to take vengeance on them in the same way.

However, Durga feels they should be punished legally and takes up the case 15 years after the murders. The trio come to known about the case is reopened and try to kill Durga by planting a bomb in her jeep. Vijay catches Peter, the man who planted the bomb and saves Durga. Peter becomes an ally of Vijay in his crusade. When Jagannath tries to molest Rekha, a bar dancer who knows Vijay, she saves herself and later tells Vijay that she escaped by knocking out Jagannath's glasses, without which he can hardly see, and Vijay recognises him as one of his father's murderers. 

Jagannath is killed by Vijay taking him in his car, removing his glasses and leaving him on the road, where he is run over by vehicles. He then makes George drunk, and mixes poison in his drink to kill him. Javed understands that his friends were murdered by Vijay and decides to challenge him. Rekha and Vijay marry. Javed reaches the hotel where they are staying and tries to kill Rekha, but escapes. 

Infuriated, Vijay tries to kill Javed but Durga, who is aware of Vijay's activities, corners and arrests him. From prison, Vijay works out a plan with Peter, creates his alibi and goes to meet Javed. Durga, who has gone to meet Javed, is caught and tied in a chair. Vijay reaches there, fights Javed and kills him in Durga's presence. 

Durga returns to the police station, only to find Vijay is in the lock-up. Durga tries to prove that Vijay had committed the murders. But in the court, she is unable to prove this as Vijay as built a strong alibi, showing he was in lock-up when the murder took place. Vijay is exonerated due to lack of evidence and leaves with Rekha, but Durga remains determined to apprehend him in the High court.

Cast 
 Shankar Nag as Vijay 
 Aarathi as Inspector Durga
 Sangeetha as Rekha
 Tiger Prabhakar as Javed
 Sundar Krishna Urs as Jagannath
 Dwarakish as Peter
 Sudheer as George
 Rajanand
 Shivaram
 Kanchana  as Durga and Vijay's mother
 Lakshman
 Udaya Kumar

Soundtrack
The music for this movie was given by Chakravarthy. The audio rights were given to Sangeetha, this movie has 5 songs sung by SPB and S. Janaki. The song "Nyaya Ellide" is one of the revolutionary hit song of the 1980s.
 "Hennu Chenna Thaane" by S. Janaki
 "Nyaya Ellide" by S. P. Balasubrahmanyam
 "Nee Kallanu Balu Tuntanu" by SPB and S. Janaki
 "Nanagu Ninagu Ibbarigu Gottu" by SPB and S. Janaki
 "Nyaya Ellide" (pathos) by SPB.

See also 
 Sattam Oru Iruttarai - The Tamil version.
 Andha Kanoon - The Hindi version 
 Chattaniki Kallu Levu - The Telugu version
 Mattuvin Chattangale - The Malayalam version

References

Kannada remakes of Tamil films
1982 films
Films scored by K. Chakravarthy
Indian action films
Indian vigilante films
1980s Kannada-language films
1982 action films
1980s vigilante films